Control of alignment and grade during construction is established through the use of survey stakes. Stakes are generally made of wood in different sizes. Based on the use of the stake they are called alignment stakes, offset stakes, grade stakes, and slope stakes.

Survey stakes are markers surveyors use in surveying projects to prepare job sites, mark out property boundaries, and provide information about claims on natural resources like timber and minerals. 

The stakes can be made from wood, metal, plastic, and other materials and typically come in a range of sizes and colors for different purposes. Sources can include surveying and construction suppliers, and people can also make or order their own for custom applications.

A survey stake is typically small, with a pointed end to make it easy to drive into the earth. It may be color-coded or have a space for people to write information on the stake. Surveyors use stakes when assessing sites to mark out boundaries, record data, and convey information to other people. On a job site, for example, survey stakes indicate where it is necessary to backfill with soil to raise the elevation, or to cut soil away to lower it. Stakes can also provide information about slope and grading for people getting a job site ready for construction.

Building engineering
Surveying